This is a list of video games by Disney Interactive Studios. For a list of Disney video games (which also released without Disney Interactive Studios' involvement), see list of Disney video games.

0-9
101 Dalmatians Print Studio (1997)
101 Dalmatians: Escape from DeVil Manor (1997)
102 Dalmatians: Puppies to the Rescue (Published by Eidos Interactive) (2000)
102 Dalmatians Activity Center (2000)

A
A Bug's Life  (1998) (Microsoft Windows, Nintendo 64, PlayStation, Game Boy Color)
Aladdin Activity Center (1994) (Microsoft Windows, Macintosh)
Aladdin (1993) (Sega Genesis, Nintendo Entertainment System, Game Boy, Game Boy Color)
Alice in Wonderland (2000) (Game Boy Color)
Alice in Wonderland (2010) (Nintendo DS, Wii, Microsoft Windows, Zeebo)
Atlantis: The Lost Empire (2001) (Game Boy Color, Game Boy Advance, PlayStation)

B
Baby Einstein: World of Discovery (V.Smile Baby)
Big Hero 6: Battle in the Bay (2014) (Nintendo DS, Nintendo 3DS) (Published by GameMill Entertainment)
Bolt (2008) (Microsoft Windows, Xbox 360, Wii, PlayStation 2, PlayStation 3, Nintendo DS)
Brave: The Video Game (2012) (Microsoft Windows, Xbox 360, Wii, PlayStation 3, Nintendo DS)
Brother Bear (2003) (Microsoft Windows, Game Boy Advance)
Buzz Lightyear of Star Command (2000) (Microsoft Windows, PlayStation, Dreamcast, Game Boy Color) (Published by Activision)

C
Cars (2006) (Published by THQ) (Microsoft Windows, Mac OS X, Xbox 360, Xbox, Wii, GameCube, PlayStation 2, Game Boy Advance, Nintendo DS, PSP)
Cars 2 (2011) (Microsoft Windows, Xbox 360, Wii, PlayStation 3, Nintendo DS, Nintendo 3DS, PSP)
Cars: Race-O-Rama (2009) (Published by THQ) (Xbox 360, Wii, PlayStation 2, PlayStation 3, Nintendo DS, PSP)
Cars Toon: Mater's Tall Tales (2010) (Wii)
Camp Rock 2: The Final Jam (2010) (Nintendo DS)
The Chase on Tom Sawyer's Island (1988)
The Cheetah Girls (2006)
The Cheetah Girls: Pop Star Sensations (2007)
The Cheetah Girls: Passport to Stardom (2008)
Chicken Little (2005) (Published by THQ in Japanese) (Microsoft Windows, Xbox, GameCube, PlayStation 2, Game Boy Advance)
Chicken Little: Ace in Action (2006) (Wii, PlayStation 2, Nintendo DS)
The Chronicles of Narnia: The Lion, the Witch and the Wardrobe (Developed by Traveller's Tales and Amaze Entertainment) (2005)
The Chronicles of Narnia: Prince Caspian (2008)
Coaster (1993)
Club Penguin: Elite Penguin Force (2008) (Nintendo DS)
Club Penguin: Elite Penguin Force: Herbert's Revenge (2010) (Nintendo DS)
Club Penguin: Game Day! (2010) (Wii)
Cory in the House (2008) (Nintendo DS)

D
The D Show (1998)
Dance Dance Revolution Disney's World Dancing Museum (2000) (Published and Developed by Konami)
Dance Dance Revolution Disney Mix (2000) (Published and Developed by Konami)
Dance Dance Revolution Disney Channel Edition (2008) (Published and Developed by Konami)
Dance Dance Revolution Disney Grooves (2009) (Published and Developed by Konami)
Desperate Housewives: The Game (2006) (Developed by Liquid Entertainment)
Dinosaur (2000) (Microsoft Windows, PlayStation, PlayStation 2, Dreamcast, Game Boy Color) (Published by Ubisoft)

Disney Channel All Star Party (2010)
Disney Fairies: Tinker Bell's Adventure (2010) (Microsoft Windows)
Disney Friends (2008)
Disney Golf (2002) (Co-Published with Electronic Arts)
Disney Hidden Worlds (2013)
Disney Infinity (2013) (Microsoft Windows, Xbox 360, Wii, PlayStation 3, Nintendo 3DS, Wii U)
Disney Infinity: Action (2013) (iOS)
Disney Infinity 2.0: Marvel Super Heroes (2014) (Microsoft Windows, Xbox 360, PlayStation 3, PlayStation Vita, Wii U, Xbox One, PlayStation 4, iOS)
Disney Infinity 3.0: Star Wars (2015) (Microsoft Windows, Xbox 360, PlayStation 3, Wii U, Xbox One, PlayStation 4, iOS)
Disney Learning: Adventures in Typing with Timon and Pumbaa (1997)
Disney Learning: MathQuest with Aladdin (1997)
Disney Learning: Mickey Mouse Kindergarten (2000) (Microsoft Windows)
Disney Learning: Mickey Mouse Preschool (2000) (Microsoft Windows)
Disney Learning: Mickey Mouse Toddler (2000) (Microsoft Windows)
Disney Learning: Phonics Quest (2001)
Disney Learning: Reading Quest with Aladdin (1998)
Disney Learning: Ready for Math With Pooh (1995)
Disney Learning: Ready to Read With Pooh (1995)
Disney Learning: The Jungle Book 1st Grade 
Disney Learning: Winnie the Pooh Kindergarten (2001) (Microsoft Windows)
Disney Learning: Winnie the Pooh Preschool (1999) (Microsoft Windows)
Disney Learning: Winnie the Pooh Toddler (1999) (Microsoft Windows)
Disney Learning Adventure: Search for the Secret Keys (2002)
Disney Magical World (2014) (Produced with Bandai Namco Games, published by Nintendo outside Japan) (Nintendo 3DS)
Disney Magical World 2 (2016) (Produced with Bandai Namco Entertainment, published by Nintendo outside Japan) (Nintendo 3DS)
Disney Move (2004)
Disney Pixar Learning: 1st Grade (1996)
Disney Pixar Learning: 2nd & 3rd Grade (1998)
Disney Princess (2003)
Disney Princess: Enchanted Journey (2007)
Disney Princess: Magical Dress-Up (2002)
Disney Princess: Magical Jewels (2007)
Disney Princess: My Fairytale Adventure (2012)
Disney Princess: Royal Adventure (2006)
Disney Princess: Royal Horse Show (2003)
Disney Sing It (2008)
Disney Sing It! – High School Musical 3: Senior Year (2008)
Disney Sing It: Family Hits (2010)
Disney Sing It: Pop Hits (2009)
Disney Sing It: Party Hits (2010)
Disney Th!nk Fast (2008)
Disney Universe (2011) (Microsoft Windows, Xbox 360, Wii, PlayStation 3)
Disney's 102 Dalmatians Activity Center (2000)
Disney's 3-D Adventure, Tigger's Family Tree (2000)
Disney's Aladdin (1993) (Sega Genesis)
Disney's Aladdin in Nasira's Revenge (2000)
Disney's American Dragon: Jake Long - Attack of the Dark Dragon (2006)
Disney's Animated Storybook: Mulan (1998)
Disney's Animated Storybook: Toy Story (1995)
Disney's Animated Storybook: Winnie the Pooh and Tigger Too (1999)
Disney's Animated Storybook: Winnie the Pooh and the Honey Tree (1996)
Disney's Arcade Frenzy (1999)
Disney's Doug's Big Game (2000)
Disney's The Emperor's New Groove Activity Center (2000)
Disney's Kim Possible: Revenge of Monkey Fist (2002) (Game Boy Advance)
Disney's Kim Possible 2: Drakken's Demise (2004) (Game Boy Advance)
Disney's Kim Possible 3: Team Possible (2005) (Game Boy Advance)
Disney's Kim Possible: What's the Switch? (2006)
Disney's Kim Possible: Kimmunicator (2005) (Nintendo DS)
Disney's Kim Possible: Global Gemini (2007) (Nintendo DS)
Disney's The Lion King: Simba's Return
Disney's The Little Mermaid: Ariel's Undersea Adventure (2006)
Disney's The Little Mermaid: Magic in Two Kingdoms (2006) (Game Boy Advance)
Disney's Magic Artist (1997)
Disney's Magic Artist 3D (2000)
Disney's Magic Artist Cartoon Maker (2001)
Disney's Magic Artist Deluxe (2001)
Disney's Magic Artist Studio (1999)
Disney's Magical Mirror Starring Mickey Mouse (2002) (GameCube) (Published by Nintendo, developed by Capcom)
Disney's Mahjongg (2003)
Disney's Tarzan Activity Center (1999)
Disney's Tigger Activity Center (2001)
Disney/Pixar's Toy Story 2 Activity Center (2002)
Disney's Stitch: Experiment 626 (2002)
Disney's Timon & Pumbaa's Jungle Games (1995)
Disney's Treasure Planet: Battle at Procyon (2002)
Disney's Villains' Revenge (1999)
Disney's Winnie the Pooh Activity Center (2000)
Donald's Alphabet Chase (1988)
Donald Duck: Goin' Quackers (Published and Developed by Ubi Soft) (2000)
DuckTales: Remastered (Published by Capcom) (2013)
DuckTales: Scrooge's Loot (2013)
Disney Universe (2011)

E
 Emoji Blitz
Epic Mickey (2010) (Wii)
Epic Mickey 2: The Power of Two (2012) (Microsoft Windows, Xbox 360, Wii, PlayStation 3, Wii U)
Epic Mickey: Power of Illusion (2012) (Nintendo 3DS)
Enchanted

F
Fantasia: Music Evolved (Xbox One, Xbox 360 Kinect)
Follow the Reader
Finding Nemo (Microsoft Windows, Xbox, GameCube, PlayStation 2, Game Boy Advance) (2003) (Published by THQ)
Frozen: Olaf's Quest (2013) (Nintendo DS, Nintendo 3DS) (Published by GameMill Entertainment)

G
G-Force: The Video Game (2009) (Microsoft Windows, Xbox 360, Wii, PlayStation 2, PlayStation 3, Nintendo DS, PSP)
Guilty Party (2010) (Wii only)
Gravity Falls: Legend of the Gnome Gemulets (2015) (Published by Ubisoft) (Nintendo 3DS)
Gravity Falls: Mystery Shack Attack (2014) (iOS, Android, and Amazon)

H
Hades Challenge (PC/MAC) (1998)	
Hannah Montana (2006)
Hannah Montana: Spotlight World Tour (2007)
Hannah Montana: The Movie (2009)
Hannah Montana: Rock Out the Show (2009)
The Haunted Mansion (Xbox/NGC/PS2) (2003) (Published by TDK Mediactive)
Hare Raising Havoc (1991) (As Walt Disney Computer Software)
Heaven & Earth (1992)
Hercules Action Game (1997) (Published by Virgin Interactive Entertainment in US, and SCEE In Europe)
High School Musical: Sing It! (PS2/Wii) (2007)
High School Musical: Work This Out (DS) (2008)
High School Musical 3: Senior Year Dance (PC/PS2/X360/Wii/DS) (2008)
High School Musical: Makin' the Cut! (DS) (2007)
Home on the Range (Game Boy Advance) (2004)
The Hunchback of Notre Dame: Topsy Turvy Games (1996)

I
The Incredibles (2004)
The Incredibles: When Danger Calls (2004)
The Incredibles: Rise of the Underminer (2005)

J
Jelly Car (2008)
Jelly Car 2 (2009)
Jelly Car 3 (2011)
The Jungle Book (1994) (Published by Virgin Interactive Entertainment)
The Jungle Book Groove Party (2000) (Published by Ubisoft)
Jonas L.A. (2009)
Just Dance: Disney Party (2012) (Published by Ubisoft) (Xbox 360, Wii)
Just Dance: Disney Party 2 (2015) (Published by Ubisoft)

K
Kinect Disneyland Adventures (Co-Published with Microsoft Studios) (2011) (Xbox 360)
Kinect Rush: A Disney-Pixar Adventure (Co-Published with Microsoft Studios) (2012) (Xbox 360) 
Kingdom Hearts (Co-Published/Developed by Square (Now Square Enix)) (2002) (PlayStation 2)
Kingdom Hearts: Chain of Memories (Co-Published/Developed by Square Enix) (2004) (PlayStation 2, Game Boy Advance)
Kingdom Hearts II (Co-Published/Developed by Square Enix) (2005) (PlayStation 2)
Kingdom Hearts Re:Chain of Memories (Co-Published/Developed by Square Enix) (2007) 
Kingdom Hearts Birth by Sleep (Co-Published/Developed by Square Enix) (2010) (PSP)
Kingdom Hearts 358/2 Days (Co-Published/Developed by Square Enix) (2009) (Nintendo DS)
Kingdom Hearts coded (Co-Published/Developed by Square Enix) (2008)
Kingdom Hearts Re:coded (Co-Published/Developed by Square Enix) (2010) (Nintendo DS)
Kingdom Hearts 3D: Dream Drop Distance (Co-Published/Developed by Square Enix) (2012) (Nintendo 3DS)
Kingdom Hearts HD 1.5 Remix (Co-Published/Developed by Square Enix) (2013) (PlayStation 3)
Kingdom Hearts HD 2.5 Remix (Co-Published/Developed by Square Enix) (2014) (PlayStation 3)
Kingdom Hearts HD 2.8 Final Chapter Prologue (Co-Published/Developed by Square Enix) (2017) (PlayStation 4)
Kingdom Hearts III (Co-Published/Developed by Square Enix) (2019) (Xbox One, PlayStation 4)

L
Lego Pirates of the Caribbean: The Video Game (developed by Traveller's Tales) (Microsoft Windows, Xbox 360, Wii, PlayStation 3, Nintendo DS, Nintendo 3DS, PSP) (2011)
Lilo and Stitch: Trouble in Paradise (Microsoft Windows, Game Boy Advance, PlayStation) (2002)
Lilo and Stitch 2: Hamsterviel Havoc (Game Boy Advance) (2004)
The Lion King (1994) (Published by Virgin Interactive Entertainment)
The Lion King Activity Center (1995)
The Lion King Simba's Mighty Adventure (2000) (Published by Activison) (PlayStation and Game Boy Color)
The Lion King 1 1/2 (Co-Published by THQ) (2003) (Game Boy Advance)
The Lion King 2: Simba's Pride Active Play (Windows 95, Windows 98, Windows Me) (1998)
Little Einsteins (developed by The Baby Einstein Company) (Game Boy Advance) (2006)
Lizzie McGuire: On the Go (2003) (Co-Published by THQ) (Game Boy Advance)
Lizzie McGuire 2: Lizzie Diaries (2004) (Published by THQ) (Game Boy Advance)
Lizzie McGuire 3: Homecoming Havoc (2005) (Published by THQ) (Game Boy Advance)

M
 Matterhorn Screamer (1988)
 Maui Mallard in Cold Shadow (1996)
 Meet the Robinsons (2007) (Microsoft Windows, Xbox 360, Wii, GameCube, PlayStation 2, Game Boy Advance, Nintendo DS)
 Mickey's Dangerous Chase (Player's Choice) (1997)
 Mickey Mania (1994) (Published by Sony Imagesoft)
 Mickey's Speedway USA (Co-Published/Developed by Rare) (2000) (Nintendo 64, Game Boy Color)
 Mittens (2013)
 Mickey's ABC's (1990)
 Mickey's 123's (1990)
 Mickey's Colors and Shapes (1990)
 Mickey's Crossword Puzzle Maker (1991)
 Mickey Saves the Day 3D Adventure (2000) (Published by Infogrames in Europe)
 Monsters, Inc. (Published by THQ) (Game Boy Advance, Game Boy Color) (2001)
 Monsters, Inc. Scream Arena (2002) (GameCube) (Published by THQ)
 Monsters, Inc. Scream Team (2001) (PlayStation, PlayStation 2, PC) (Published by Sony Computer Entertainment)
 My Disney Kitchen (2002) (Published by BAM! Entertainment, developed by Atlus)

N
 Nightmare Ned (1997) (Microsoft Windows)

P
Peter Pan: Adventures in Never Land
Peter Pan: The Legend of Never Land
Phil of the Future
Phineas and Ferb (2008)
Phineas and Ferb: Ride Again (2010)
Phineas and Ferb: Across the 2nd Dimension (Wii, PlayStation 3, Nintendo DS, PSP, PlayStation Vita) (2011 for Wii, PS3, and DS and 2012 for PSP and PlayStation Vita)
Phineas and Ferb: Quest for Cool Stuff (Xbox 360, Wii, Nintendo DS, Nintendo 3DS, Wii U) (2013)
Piglet's Big Game (2003) (Published by Gotham Games, THQ)
Pinocchio (Game Boy, Sega Genesis, Super Nintendo Entertainment System) (1996)
Pirates of the Caribbean Online, massive multiplayer online game, servers were closed in 2013 (2007) (Microsoft Windows, iMac)
Pirates of the Caribbean: The Curse of the Black Pearl (2003) (Published by TDK Mediactive)
Pirates of the Caribbean: Dead Man's Chest (Developed by Amaze Entertainment and Griptonite Games) (2006)
Pirates of the Caribbean (developed by Bethesda and Akella) (2003) (Microsoft Windows, Xbox)
Pirates of the Caribbean: At World's End (2007) (Microsoft Windows, Xbox 360, Wii, PlayStation 2, PlayStation 3, Nintendo DS, PSP)
Playmation (2015)
Pocahontas (1996) (Sega Genesis, Game Boy)
Pooh's Party Game: In Search of the Treasure (2001)
Power Rangers: Super Legends (2007) (developed by A2M [home version] and Handheld Games [portable version]) (PlayStation 2, PC, Nintendo DS)
The Princess and the Frog (2009) (Microsoft Windows, Wii, Nintendo DS)
Pure, (2008) an off-road racing video game for Microsoft Windows, Xbox 360 and PlayStation 3

R
Ratatouille (Published by THQ) (Microsoft Windows, Mac OS X, Xbox 360, Xbox, Wii, GameCube, PlayStation 2, PlayStation 3, Game Boy Advance, Nintendo DS, PSP) (2007)
Rolie Polie Olie: The Search for Spot (PC) (2001)

S
Spectrobes (2007)
Spectrobes: Beyond the Portals (2008)
Spectrobes: Origins (2009)
Spy Kids: Challenger (Co-published by THQ) (2002) (Game Boy Advance)
Spy Kids 3-D: Game Over (Published by THQ) (2003) (Microsoft Windows, Game Boy Advance)
Stunt Island (1992)
SingStar Singalong with Disney (2008) (Published by SCEE)
Sonny with a Chance (2010) (Nintendo DS)
Split/Second (2010) (Developed by Black Rock Studios) (Microsoft Windows, Xbox 360, PlayStation 3, PSP)
Stanley: Tiger Tales (2001)
Stanley: Wild for Sharks! (2002)
Star Wars: Tiny Death Star (2013) (Co-Developed by Disney Mobile and NimbleBit)
Star Wars: Attack Squadrons (Canceled) (Developed by Area 52 Games)
The Suite Life of Zack & Cody: Tipton Trouble (2006)
The Suite Life of Zack & Cody: Circle of Spies (2007) (Game Boy Advance)

T
Tangled: The Video Game (2010) (Microsoft Windows, Wii, Nintendo DS)
Tarzan (1999) (Published by Sony Computer Entertainment on the PlayStation, and Activision on the Game Boy Color)
Tarzan: Return to the Jungle (2002) (Published by Activision)
Tarzan Untamed (2001) (Published and Developed by Ubisoft)
That's So Raven
That's So Raven 2: Supernatural Style (2006) (Game Boy Advance)
That's So Raven: Psychic on the Scene (2006) (Game Boy Advance)
Tigger's Honey Hunt (2000) (Published by NewKidCo)
Tim Burton's The Nightmare Before Christmas: Oogie's Revenge (Developed by Capcom) (2004: Japan); (2005: U.S.)
Treasure Planet: Etherium Rescue (2002)
Treasure Planet: Broadside Blast (2002)
Treasure Planet: Treasure Racer (2002)
Tron 2.0 (Developed by Monolith Productions) (2003)
Tron: Evolution (2010) (Microsoft Windows, Xbox 360, PlayStation 3, Nintendo DS, PSP)
Tron: Evolution - Battle Grids (2010) (Nintendo Wii)
Toy Story (1995) (Microsoft Windows, Super Nintendo Entertainment System, Sega Genesis, Game Boy)
Toy Story 2: Buzz Lightyear to the Rescue (1999) (Microsoft Windows, Nintendo 64, PlayStation, Dreamcast, Game Boy Color, PlayStation Network) (Published by Activision, THQ)
Toy Story 3: The Video Game (2010) (Microsoft Windows, Xbox 360, Wii, PlayStation 2, PlayStation 3, Nintendo DS, PSP)
Toy Story Mania! (2009 for Wii and iOS and 2012 for Xbox 360 and PlayStation 3) (Xbox 360, Wii, PlayStation 3, iOS)
Turok (Published as Touchstone Games) (2008)

U
Ultimate Band (2008)
Up (Published by THQ) (Microsoft Windows, Xbox 360, Wii, PlayStation 2, PlayStation 3, Nintendo DS, PSP) (2009)

W
WALL-E (Co-Published by THQ) (Microsoft Windows, Xbox 360, Wii, PlayStation 2, PlayStation 3, Nintendo DS, PSP) (2008)
Walt Disney World Quest: Magical Racing Tour (Published by Eidos Interactive) (2000) (Microsoft Windows, PlayStation, Dreamcast, Game Boy Color)
Where's My Water? (published under Disney Mobile) (2011) (iOS) 
Where's My Water? 2 (published under Disney Mobile) (2013) (iOS)
Where's My Mickey? (published under Disney Mobile) (2013) (iOS)
Where's My Perry? (published under Disney Mobile) (iOS)
Who Wants to Be King of the Jungle (Developed by JellyVision, published under Buena Vista Interactive)
The Wiggles: Wiggle Bay (2003) (PC) (US distribution)
The Wiggles: Wiggly Party (2003) (PC) (US distribution)
Winnie the Pooh's Rumbly Tumbly Adventure (2005) (Published and Developed by Ubisoft)
W.I.T.C.H. (2005)
Wizards of Waverly Place (2009)
Wizards of Waverly Place: Spellbound (2010)
Wreck-it Ralph (Co-Published by Activision) (Wii, Nintendo DS, Nintendo 3DS) (2012)
Who Framed Roger Rabbit (1988)
Who Wants To Be A Millionaire video games (published under Buena Vista Interactive)

See also
List of Disney video games

References

External links
Official website
Buena Vista Games profile on MobyGames
Profile on Gamespot 
Profile on IGN 

 
Disney Interactive Studios
Video games by Disney Interactive Studios